Psi Phoenicis (ψ Phoenicis) is a star in the constellation Phoenix. Its apparent magnitude varies from 4.3 to 4.5 with a period of about 30 days and it is approximately 342 light years away based on parallax.

Psi Phoenicis is a red giant in the asymptotic branch with a spectral type of M4III, indicating it is an evolved star in the last evolutionary stage before becoming a white dwarf. In 1973 astronomer Olin J. Eggen discovered it is a variable star, varying in magnitude between 4.3 and 4.5 with an approximate period of 30 days. A more recent study identified two possible periods of 43.7 and 48.1 days, with amplitudes of 0.038 and 0.023 magnitudes. The star is classified as a semiregular variable, of no specific subtype.

In 2001, Psi Phoenicis was observed by the VLT Interferometer with the test instrument VINCI.

By having directly measured distance, radius and luminosity, Psi Phoenicis was included in a list of 34 well characterized stars to be used as a reference. This program made the first measurement of the metallicity of Psi Phoenicis, showing it is a metal-poor star with only 5% the amount of iron of the Sun ([Fe/H] = ). This value has a large uncertainty due to the difficulties in modeling the spectra of cool stars, which have strong molecular absorption.

Psi Phoenicis is considered a single star, and has no known companions. It has been considered a possible spectroscopic binary, including in the Hipparcos Catalogue, which stems from spectroscopic observations in 1919 which showed a possibly variable radial velocity. More recent data, however, showed the velocity to be constant.

References

M-type giants
Asymptotic-giant-branch stars
Semiregular variable stars
Phoenix (constellation)
Phoenicis, Psi
Durchmusterung objects
011695
008837
0555